Ragon may refer to:

People

Surname
 Charles Ragon de Bange (1833–1914), French artillery officer and Polytechnician
 Heartsill Ragon (1885–1940), United States Representative from Arkansas
 Henriette Ragon (1918–2015), stage name Patachou, French singer and actress
 Jean-Marie Ragon (1781–1862), French freemason, author, and editor
 Michel Ragon (1924–2020), French art and literature critic and writer
 Phillip Ragon, American entrepreneur and philanthropist, founder and current CEO of InterSystems

Given name
 Ragon Perera (born 1985), Sri Lankan cricketer

Other uses
 Ragon Institute, a medical institute at the Massachusetts General Hospital in Boston, Massachusetts, United States